The 2018 Boise State Broncos football team represented Boise State University during the 2018 NCAA Division I FBS football season. This season was the Broncos' 82nd season overall, fifth under head coach Bryan Harsin, eighth as a member of the Mountain West Conference and sixth within the Mountain Division. The Broncos played their home games at Albertsons Stadium in Boise, Idaho. They finished the season 10–3, 7–1 in Mountain West play to finish in a tie for first place in the Mountain Division with Utah State. Due to their head-to-head win over Utah State, they were champions of the Mountain Division. They represented the Mountain Division in the Mountain West Championship Game where they lost to West Division champion Fresno State. They were invited to the First Responder Bowl against Boston College. With 5:08 left in the 1st quarter, the bowl game was delayed and ultimately canceled and ruled a no contest.

Previous season
The Broncos finished the 2017 season 11–3, 7–1 in Mountain West play to win the Mountain Division. They defeated West Division champion Fresno State in the Mountain West Championship Game to become Mountain West champions. They were invited to the Las Vegas Bowl where they defeated Oregon.

Preseason

Award watch lists
Listed in the order that they were released

Mountain West media days
During the Mountain West media days held July 24–25 at the Cosmopolitan on the Las Vegas Strip, the Broncos were unanimously predicted as favorites to win the Mountain Division title.

Media poll

Preseason All-Mountain West Team
The Broncos had eight players selected to the preseason all-Mountain West team. Quarterback Brett Rypien was selected as preseason offensive player of the year and kick/punt returner Avery Williams was selected as preseason special teams player of the year.

Offense

Brett Rypien – QB

Alexander Mattison – RB

Ezra Cleveland – OL

John Molchon – OL

Defense

David Moa – DL

Curtis Weaver – DL

Tyler Horton – DB

Specialists

Avery Williams – KR/PR

Schedule

Schedule Source:

Game summaries

at Troy

    
    
    
    
    
    
    
    
    
    

 Passing leaders: Brett Rypien (BSU): 20–28, 305 YDS, 4 TD; Keleb Barker (Troy): 20–29, 211 YDS, 1 TD, 1 INT.
 Rushing leaders: Alexander Mattison (BSU): 14 CAR, 56 YDS, 1 TD; Jabir Frye (Troy): 7 CAR, 41 YDS, 1 TD.
 Receiving leaders: Sean Modster (BSU): 7 REC, 167 YDS 2 TD; Deondre Douglas (Troy): 7 REC, 102 YDS, 1 TD.

Senior cornerback Tyler Horton, who finished the game with four tackles and two fumble recoveries which were both returned for touchdowns, was named Mountain West Defensive Player of the Week. Horton was also named the Bronko Nagurski Trophy National Defensive Player of the Week.

UConn

    
    
    
    
    
    
    
    
    
    

 Passing leaders: Brett Rypien (BSU): 21–28, 362 YDS, 3 TD; David Pindell (UCONN): 11–21, 71 YDS, 1 TD, 1 INT.
 Rushing leaders: Alexander Mattison (BSU): 11 CAR, 115 YDS, 2 TD; Kevin Mensah (UCONN): 82 CAR.
 Receiving leaders: John Hightower (BSU): 5 REC, 119 YDS, 1 TD; Hergy Mayala (UCONN): 3 REC, 24 YDS

The Broncos set a school record for offensive yards in a game with 818 yards. The previous record was 742 set against Colorado State in 2011. Quarterback Brett Rypien was named Mountain West Offensive Player of the Week.

at Oklahoma State

    
    
    
    
    
    
    
    
    
    

 Passing leaders: Brett Rypien (BSU): 39–56, 380 YDS, 3 TD; Taylor Cornelius (OKST): 15–26, 243 YDS, 1 TD.
 Rushing leaders: Alexander Mattison (BSU): 14 CAR, 53 YDS; Justice Hill (OKST): 15 CAR, 123 YDS, 1 TD.
 Receiving leaders: A. J. Richardson (BSU): 6 REC, 70 YDS, 1 TD; Tylan Wallace (OKST): 5 REC, 105 YDS.

at Wyoming

    
    
    
    
    
    
    

 Passing leaders: Brett Rypien (BSU): 28–42, 342 YDS, 2 TD; Tyler Vander Waal (WYO): 15–25, 214 YDS, 1 TD.
 Rushing leaders: Alexander Mattison (BSU): 20 CAR, 57 YDS, 1 TD; Nico Evans (WYO): 12 CAR, 141 YDS, 1 TD.
 Receiving leaders: A.J. Richardson (BSU): 6 REC, 113 YDS, 1 TD; James Price (WYO): 2 REC, 77 YDS, 1 TD.

San Diego State

    
    
    
    
    

 Passing leaders: Brett Rypien (BSU): 21–41, 170 YDS, 2 INT; Ryan Agnew (SDSU): 8–15, 113 YDS.
 Rushing leaders: Alexander Mattison (BSU): 25 CAR, 66 YDS, 2 TD; Chase Jasmin (SDSU): 26 CAR, 78 YDS, 1 TD.
 Receiving leaders: Sean Modster (BSU): 4 REC, 44 YDS; Fred Trevillion (SDSU): 3 REC, 57 YDS.

at Nevada

    
    
    
    
    
    
    
    
    

 Passing leaders: Brett Rypien (BSU): 28–38, 299 YDS, 2 TD, 3 INT; Ty Gangi (NEV): 24–42, 304 YDS, 2 TD, 1 INT.
 Rushing leaders: Alexander Mattison (BSU): 24 CAR, 69 YDS; Kelton Moore (NEV): 8 CAR, 35 YDS.
 Receiving leaders: A.J. Richardson (BSU): 4 REC, 79 YDS, 1 TD; McLane Mannix (NEV): 4 REC, 109 YDS, 1 TD.

Colorado State

    
    
    
    
    
    
    
    
    
    
    

 Passing leaders: Brett Rypein (BSU): 22–26, 308 YDS, 4 TD; K. J. Carta-Samuels (CSU): 19–30, 244 YDS, 2 TD, 2 INT.
 Rushing leaders: Alexander Mattison (BSU): 20 CAR, 85 YDS, 1 TD; Izzy Matthews (CSU): 12 CAR, 109 YDS, 1 TD.
 Receiving leaders: A.J. Richardson (BSU): 6 REC, 137 YDS, 2 TD; Preston Williams (CSU): 9 REC, 154 YDS, 1 TD.

at Air Force

    
    
    
    
    
    
    
    
    
    
    
    
    

 Passing leaders: Brett Rypien (BSU): 20–34, 399 YDS, 5 TD; Isaiah Sanders (AF): 10–15, 210 YDS, 2 TD.
 Rushing leaders: Alexander Mattison (BSU): 22 CAR, 136 YDS, 1 TD; Isaiah Sanders (AF): 28 CAR, 97 YDS, 1 TD.
 Receiving leaders: John Hightower (BSU): 8 REC, 182 YDS, 3 TD; Joseph Saucier (AF): 2 REC, 77 YDS.

BYU

    
    
    
    
    
    

 Passing leaders: Brett Rypien (BSU): 23–35, 214 YDS, 1 TD, 1 INT; Zach Wilson (BYU): 18–27, 252 YDS.
 Rushing leaders: Alexander Mattison (BSU): 25 CAR, 89 YDS, 2 TD; Matt Hadley (BYU): 11 CAR, 39 YDS.
 Receiving leaders: A.J. Richardson (BSU): 4 REC, 53 YDS, 1 TD; Talon Shumway (BYU): 3 REC, 62 YDS.

Fresno State

    
    
    
    
    
    

 Passing leaders: Brett Rypien (BSU): 24–29, 269 YDS, 1 TD, 1 INT; Marcus McMaryion (FRES): 24–35, 283 YDS, 1 TD.
 Rushing leaders: Alexander Mattison (BSU): 30 CAR, 144 YDS, 2 TD; Jordan Mims (FRES): 8 CAR, 47 YDS.
 Receiving leaders: A.J. Richardson (BSU): 5 REC, 66 YDS; KeeSean Johnson (FRES): 8 REC, 95 YDS, 1 TD.

Quarterback Brett Rypien broke the Mountain West record for passing yards in a career, which now stands at 12,924 yards. The previous record was 12,690 set by Ryan Lindley of San Diego State in 2011. He also broke the Mountain West career completions record, also previously held by Lindley, and now has 981 career completions.

at New Mexico

    
    
    
    
    
    
    
    

 Passing leaders: Brett Rypien (BSU): 17–27, 222 YDS, 3 TD; Sheriron Jones (UNM): 7–11, 88 YDS, 1 INT.
 Rushing leaders: Alexander Mattison (BSU): 20 CAR, 145 YDS, 1 TD; Sheriron Jones (UNM): 12 CAR, 56 YDS.
 Receiving leaders: Sean Modster (BSU): 9 REC, 129 YDS, 3 TD; Delane Hart-Johnson (UNM): 4 REC, 77 YDS.

Utah State

    
    
    
    
    
    
    
    
    

 Passing leaders: Brett Rypien (BSU): 23–32, 310 YDS, 1 TD; Jordan Love (USU): 29–47, 363 YDS, 3 TD, 1 INT.
 Rushing leaders: Alexander Mattison (BSU): 37 CAR, 200 YDS, 3 TD; Darwin Thompson (USU): 11 CAR, 61 YDS.
 Receiving leaders: CT Thomas (BSU): 6 REC, 89 YDS; Aaren Vaughns (USU): 7 REC, 107 YDS.

Running back Alexander Mattison was named Mountain West Offensive Player of the Week following rushing for 200 yards and 3 touchdowns on a career high 37 carries. He also added 3 catches for 12 yards.

Fresno State (Mountain West Championship Game)

    
    
    
    
    
    

 

 Passing leaders: Brett Rypien (BSU): 15–31, 125 YDS, 1 TD; Marcus McMaryion (FRES): 21–33, 170 YDS, 1 TD.
 Rushing leaders: Alexander Mattison (BSU): 40 CAR, 200 YDS, 1 TD; Ronnie Rivers (FRES): 17 CAR, 63 YDS, 1 TD.
 Receiving leaders: Sean Modster (BSU): 4 REC, 45 YDS, 1 TD; Michiah Quick (FRES): 4 REC, 45 YDS, 1 TD.

vs. Boston College (First Responder Bowl)

With Boston College leading 7–0 with 5:08 remaining in the 1st quarter, the game was delayed due to inclement weather. After an hour and a half delay, the game was canceled and ruled a no contest.

Rankings

Post-season awards

Mountain West Offensive Player of the Year

Brett Rypien – Sr. QB

Mountain West first team
Offense

Brett Rypien – Sr. QB

Alexander Mattison – Jr. RB

Ezra Cleveland – So. OL

John Molchon – Jr. OL

Defense

Curtis Weaver – So. DL

Jabril Frazier – Sr. DL

Tyler Horton – Sr. DB

Mountain West second team
Offense

Sean Modster – Sr. WR

Mountain West honorable mention

Durrant Miles – Sr. DL

Kekoa Nawahine – Jr. DB

Avery Williams – So. DB/RS

Award Reference:

Personnel

Coaching staff

Roster

Players drafted into the NFL

References

Boise State
Boise State Broncos football seasons
Boise State Broncos football